Matthew Bonifacio (born c. 1973) is an American filmmaker.  He was born and raised in Brooklyn.  Bonifacio is married to Julianna Gelinas Bonifacio.

For their work in Lbs., Bonifacio and Carmine Famiglietti were nominated for the Independent Spirit John Cassavetes Award at the 26th Independent Spirit Awards.

Select filmography
Lbs. (2004)
Amexicano (2007)
The Quitter (2014)
Master Maggie (2019)

References

External links
 

Living people
American filmmakers
People from Brooklyn
Year of birth missing (living people)